The FIA World Endurance Championship (WEC) is an endurance auto racing series administered by the governing body of motorsport, the Fédération Internationale de l'Automobile (FIA), and co-organised and promoted by the automotive group, the Automobile Club de l'Ouest (ACO). There were two types of car called Le Mans Prototype (LMP) and Le Mans Grand Touring Endurance (LMGTE) divided into four classes when the WEC began in 2012: Le Mans Prototype 1 (LMP1), Le Mans Prototype 2 (LMP2), Le Mans Grand Touring Endurance Pro (LMGTE Pro) and Le Mans Grand Touring Endurance Am (LMGTE Am). The Le Mans Hypercar (Hypercar) class was introduced in the 2021 season to replace the LMP1 category and the Le Mans Daytona Hybrid (LMDh) class was introduced in the 2022 championship.

The series awards international championships, cups, and trophies to the most successful drivers, teams, and manufacturers in each of the series' categories over the course of a season.  Points are awarded based on individual race results as well as for earning pole position in qualifying, with the highest tally of points winning the respective championship, cup, or trophy.  The highest awards in the series are the FIA World Endurance Drivers' Championship and the FIA World Endurance Manufacturers' Championship, both of which centre around participants in the Hypercar and LMP categories. The champions are not officially crowned until the FIA Prize Giving Ceremony held in December following the conclusion of the WEC season.

 78 drivers have won a WEC title. There have been 21 overall World Drivers' Champions and six LMP1 Private Drivers' Trophy winners. Sébastien Buemi and Brendon Hartley, with three victories, have won the most overall World Drivers' Championships. Timo Bernhard, Mike Conway, Kamui Kobayashi and José María López each have two titles. Toyota have won the most overall World Manufacturers' and Drivers' Championships with five. Of the 22 drivers to win an LMP2 title, Julien Canal and Nicolas Lapierre hold the record for the most Drivers' Championships in the category with two. From the nine LMP2 Endurance Trophy for Teams winners, Signatech Alpine have earned the most titles with two. 28 drivers have won a LMGTE title in either the Pro or Am categories. James Calado, Alessandro Pier Guidi, François Perrodo and Marco Sørensen have achieved the most LMGTE Drivers' titles in any category with three and Ferrari have won the most LMGTE World Manufacturers and Cup titles with seven.

Key

World Championships

World Endurance Drivers' Championship
Held since the inception of the series, the Drivers' Championship was initially open to all participants in the FIA World Endurance Championship.  This was altered for the 2013 season with the introduction of the FIA World Endurance Cup for GT Drivers as well as the FIA Endurance Trophies for LMP2 and LMGTE Am drivers.  The Drivers' Championship was then limited to participants in the LMP1 and LMP2 categories, although LMP2 drivers and privately entered LMP1 drivers are also eligible for their own FIA Trophies. LMDh drivers were not eligible to accumulate points in the 2022 season since they could only participate on a race-by-race basis.

World Endurance GT Drivers' Championship
The World Endurance Cup for GT Drivers was created in 2013 to give LMGTE drivers their own title separate from the World Drivers' Championship, before being promoted to World Championship status in 2017.  Drivers in both the LMGTE Pro and LMGTE Am categories are eligible for the overall championship, although LMGTE Am drivers are also eligible for their own FIA Trophy.

A grey background and the  symbol denotes a season in which the World Cup for GT Drivers was awarded.

World Manufacturers' Championship
The Manufacturers' Championship has been exclusive to LMP1 entries supported by major automotive manufacturers.  Points were awarded to the leading car from each manufacturer until the 2014 season when the top two finishers from each manufacturer were eligible for points.  In 2014 the LMP1 class was also divided, with manufacturers limited solely to the LMP1-H category.  For the 2012 season, only the scores from six events counted towards the championship, the 24 Hours of Le Mans plus the five best race results over the season.

Following the 2017 season the Manufacturers' Championship was dropped due to a lack of manufacturer competition in LMP1.  A new LMP1 World Championship was created to be awarded to teams instead.

LMP1 World Endurance Championship
With a lack of manufacturers in the LMP1 championship for the 2018–19 season, a new World Championship was created to be awarded to LMP1 teams in place of the former manufacturers' championship.  Unlike the manufacturers' championship, only the top scoring car from each team is eligible to score points.

Hypercar World Endurance Championship
With Hypercar replacing LMP1 as the top class in the WEC for the 2021 season, a new World Championship was created to be awarded to the Hypercar competitor who scored the greatest amount of points after considering the results of their best placed car in the overall classification of each race. For the 2022 season, the championship format was changed from teams to manufacturers. LMDh competitors were ineligible for championship points because they were only permitted to enter on a race-by-race basis.

World GT Manufacturers' Championship

As with the World Endurance GT Drivers' Championship, the World Endurance Cup for GT Manufacturers was elevated to World Championship status in 2017. The championship is open to all manufacturers participating in the LMGTE categories, although only manufacturers who competed in the whole season are eligible for points.  All teams from the manufacturers entered for the entire season are eligible for points.  The top two finishers, regardless of category, are awarded points toward the championship.

A grey background and the  symbol denotes a season in which the World Cup for GT Manufacturers was awarded.

Trophies

LMP1 Private Teams Drivers' Trophy
The FIA Trophy for the drivers of private entries in the LMP1 category was created in 2014 to award non-manufacturer entries. It was awarded to the highest-placed LMP1 privateer squad that entered a car that did not feature hybrid technology from 2015 onward. Due to a lack of privateer LMP1 entries in 2017, the trophy was not awarded before eventually being dropped altogether.

Endurance Trophy for LMP2 Drivers
The Trophy for LMP2 Drivers was awarded from 2013 onward to allow LMP2 drivers their own title separate from the World Endurance Drivers' Championship.

Endurance Trophy for LMP2 Pro/Am Drivers
The Trophy for LMP2 Pro/Am Drivers was introduced in the 2021 season for LMP2 driver crews featuring at least one bronze-rated driver (gentleman driver).

Endurance Trophy for LMGTE Am Drivers
The Trophy for LMGTE Am Drivers is an additional title separate from the World Cup for GT Drivers, only open to drivers in LMGTE Am.

Endurance Trophy for Private LMP1 Teams
A teams title was not held for manufacturers in the LMP1 category, instead a Trophy was awarded to privately entered LMP1 teams.  Note that points in this Trophy were awarded solely on the finishing position of private LMP1 entries, with manufacturer entries not included. Although teams may have earned points for a win in the Trophy, they did not score a win in the overall LMP1 standings.  Due to a lack of privateer LMP1 entries in 2017, the trophy was not awarded before being dropped altogether.

Endurance Trophy for LMP2 Teams

For the 2012 season, multi-car teams were awarded points based on their highest finishing entry. From 2013 onward, each entry was scored as its own team.

Endurance Trophy for LMP2 Pro/Am Teams
The Trophy for LMP2 Pro/Am Teams was introduced in the 2021 season for LMP2 teams featuring at least one bronze-rated driver (gentleman driver) in their lineup.

Endurance Trophy for LMGTE Pro Teams
For the 2012 season, multi-car teams were awarded points based on their highest finishing entry. From 2013 onward, each entry was scored as its own team. The Endurance Trophy for LMGTE Pro Teams was dropped for the 2018–19 season.

Endurance Trophy for LMGTE Am Teams

For the 2012 season, multi-car teams were awarded points based on their highest finishing entry. From 2013 onward, each entry was scored as its own team.

Notes

References

General

Specific

External links
 

FIA World Endurance Championship
FIA World Endurance
FIA World Endurance
FIA World Endurance Championship